This a list of the Spanish PROMUSICAE Top 20 Singles number-ones of 2009.

2009

See also 
2009 in music
List of number-one hits in Spain

References

2009 in Spanish music
Spain
2009